The Raso wall gecko (Tarentola raziana) is a species of geckos in the family Phyllodactylidae. The species is endemic to Cape Verde, where it occurs on the island of Santa Luzia and the islets of Branco and Raso. The species was named by Hans Hermann Schleich in 1984. The specific name raziana refers to the islet Raso where it is found.

Taxonomy
Previously a subspecies Tarentola caboverdiana raziana, it was elevated to species status in 2012.

References

Further reading
Schleich, 1984 : Die Geckos der Gattung Tarentola der Kapverden (Reptilia: Sauria: Gekkonidae) [Geckos of the Tarentola Species in Cape Verde]. Courier Forschungsinstitut Senckenberg, vol. 68, p. 95-106. 

raziana
Geckos of Africa
Endemic vertebrates of Cape Verde
Reptiles described in 1984
Taxa named by Hans Hermann Schleich